Wade MacLeod (born January 20, 1987) is a Canadian professional ice hockey player currently signed to Norwegian side Narvik IK. He most recently played for Manchester Storm in the UK Elite Ice Hockey League (EIHL).

Playing career
MacLeod attended the Northeastern University from 2007 to 2011 where he played NCAA Division I college hockey with the Northeastern Huskies men's ice hockey team, scoring 137 points in 149 games played.

On March 21, 2011, MacLeod signed an amateur tryout agreement with the Springfield Falcons of the American Hockey League, and he signed an extension with the team prior to the start of the 2011–12 AHL season.

On September 30, 2013, MacLeod was signed to a one-year contract with the Toronto Marlies of the American Hockey League. On November 21, 2013, MacLeod was loaned to ECHL affiliate, the Orlando Solar Bears.

On September 15, 2014, MacLeod signed a one-year ECHL contract with the Idaho Steelheads. In the 2014–15 season, MacLeod scored a professional high with 80 points in 72 games.

On the back of his breakout season with the Steelheads, on May 15, 2015, MacLeod signed his first contract abroad with German club, Starbulls Rosenheim of the DEL2.

After a spell with Löwen Frankfurt, MacLeod stepped away from hockey. However in August 2021, MacLeod agreed terms with UK Elite Ice Hockey League (EIHL) side Manchester Storm. He left Manchester by mutual consent in November 2021.

At the end of November 2021, MacLeod subsequently signed with Norwegian side Narvik IK, later playing one game on loan with Lillehammer IK.

Awards and honors

References

External links

1987 births
Living people
Allen Americans players
Canadian ice hockey left wingers
Evansville IceMen players
Idaho Steelheads (ECHL) players
Lillehammer IK players
Löwen Frankfurt players
Manchester Storm (2015–) players
Narvik IK players
Northeastern Huskies men's ice hockey players
Orlando Solar Bears (ECHL) players
Springfield Falcons players
Starbulls Rosenheim players
Toronto Marlies players